Brian Soi (born May 3, 1985) is a former American football defensive tackle. He was signed by the Miami Dolphins as an undrafted free agent in 2007. He played college football at Utah State.

Soi has also been a member of the New York Giants and the Green Bay Packers.

Professional career

Green Bay Packers
Soi was signed by the Green Bay Packers on April 14, 2009. He was later released. It was announced the Soi would be a member of the Utah Blaze for the 2010 season.

References

External links
Green Bay Packers bio
New York Giants bio
Utah State Aggies bio

1985 births
Living people
American football defensive tackles
Utah State Aggies football players
Miami Dolphins players
New York Giants players
Green Bay Packers players
American sportspeople of Samoan descent
Players of American football from Honolulu